Starborn (Benjamin Warner) is a fictional character, a superhero that appears in comic books published by Boom! Studios. The character was created by writer-editor Stan Lee with Chris Roberson and Khary Randolph. The character first appeared in Starborn #1 (December 2010).

References

Comics characters introduced in 2010
Characters created by Stan Lee
Superhero comics
Boom! Studios titles